Lord Fury was a Thoroughbred racehorse that won the 1961 Melbourne Cup.

In the lead up to the 1961 Melbourne Cup, Lord Fury ran a disappointing last in the Mackinnon Stakes after placing second in the Caulfield Cup. Because of this poor performance, Lord Fury went into the Melbourne Cup as a 20/1 chance. Trained by F.B. Lewis and ridden by Ray Selkrig, Lord Fury led all the way to win the cup, a feat not achieved again until Might and Power led all the way to win the 1997 Melbourne Cup.

References

1957 racehorse births
Melbourne Cup winners
Racehorses bred in Australia
Thoroughbred family 13-a